Philodryas patagoniensis, also known as the Patagonia green racer, is a species of rear-fanged (opisthoglyphous) venomous snake in the family Colubridae. The species is endemic to cis-Andean South America from northern Argentina to northeastern Brazil; despite its name, most of its range is outside Patagonia.

Description
P. patagoniensis is a medium-sized, cylindrical and robust snake, with a moderately long tail. The snout is rounded. The eye is medium-sized with a round pupil. The dorsal scales are smooth with unique apical scores.

Behavior
P. patagoniensis is terrestrial, fundamentally arboreal when foraging, and has daytime habits. It has a brownish color that helps in its camouflage.

Sexual dimorphism and reproduction
P. patagoniensis has sexual dimorphism in adult specimens. Females have a longer body, with greater corpulence, while males have a longer tail. Females are born with a greater rostro-cloacal length and reach sexual maturity later than males, about 2-years-old. Males can reach sexual maturity at 1-year-old. Reproduction is seasonal, with the vitellogenic season occurring between the months of July and October.

Diet
P. patagoniensis preys upon snakes including its own species. Juveniles feed on ectothermic animals, while adults feed on endothermic animals.

Predators
P. patagoniensis is preyed upon by birds such as Cariama cristata and Tyto alba, as well as other snakes such as Boiruna maculata.

Geographic range
P. patagoniensis is found in Argentina, Bolivia, Brazil, Paraguay, and Uruguay.

Habitat
P. patagoniensis occurs in a range of open habitats including Patagonian steppe, Cerrado, Chaco, and Caatinga, and also open areas of the Atlantic forest.

Common names
Common names for P. patagoniensis include corre campo, parelheira, parelheira comum, papa pinto, culebra del alfa, culebra de los pastos, ratonera, and mboi hovy.

Venom
P. patagoniensis produces toxic saliva through the Duvernoy's gland. Its toxin is constituted by 90% protein, mainly metalloproteinases. The biological activity of the toxins is very similar to that of Bothrops, with edematogenic, hemorrhagic, nociceptive, and necrosis activity of this compound. This species has an LD50 of 58.58 µg / mouse, a value close to Bothrops jararacussu with 58.8 µg / mouse, its toxicity is between Bothrops alternatus with 67.5 µg / mouse and Bothrops jararaca with 24.7 µg / mouse. However, P. patagoniensis has opisthoglyphous dentition and has difficulty injecting venom. Its venom also contains neurotoxic and myotoxic components, which result in neuromuscular block and myonecrosis.

References

Further reading
Freiberg M (1982). Snakes of South America. Hong Kong: T.F.H. Publications. 189 pp. . (Philodryas patagoniensis, pp. 106, 140 + photographs of juveniles and adult on p. 147). 
Girard C (1858). "Descriptions of some new Reptiles, collected by the U. S. Exploring Expedition, under the command of Capt. Charles Wilkes, U. S. N. Third Part.—Including the species of Ophidians, exotic to North America". Proceedings of the Academy of Natural Sciences of Philadelphia 9: 181–182. (Callirhinus patagoniensis, new species, p. 182).
Melo-Sampaio PR, Passos P, Martins AR, Jennings WB, Moura-Leite JC, Morato SAA, Venegas PJ, Chávez G, Venâncio NM, Souza MB (2020). "A phantom on the trees: Integrative taxonomy supports a reappraisal of rear-fanged snakes classification (Dipsadidae: Philodryadini)". Zoologischer Anzeiger 290: 19–39. (Pseudablabes patagoniensis, new combination). (Published online 2020; print edition 2021).

Colubrids
Snakes of South America
Reptiles of Argentina
Reptiles of Bolivia
Reptiles of Brazil
Reptiles of Paraguay
Reptiles of Uruguay
Reptiles described in 1858
Taxa named by Charles Frédéric Girard